Deathray (1998–2007) was a band from Sacramento, California, formed by former Cake members Greg Brown and Victor Damiani, and Dana Gumbiner, a musician formerly of the Sacramento indie band Little Guilt Shrine.

After leaving Cake, Brown and bassist Victor Damiani met up with Gumbiner, who was playing solo shows under a variety of names, most notably The Micronauts. The three recruited multi-talented rock and jazz drummer James Neil and keyboardist Max Hart to form Deathray.  After selling over 3,000 copies of their EP, Deathray was signed to Capricorn Records.

Their self-titled debut album was produced by Eric Valentine and released in 2000. While the album received critical praise, the band's future became murky during the collapse of Capricorn and a hastily organized nationwide tour. After a long battle, Deathray was dropped from Capricorn, but regained control of the masters from their album, which they have since released on their own label, Doppler Records.

Shortly thereafter, Hart left the band to move to Los Angeles and form his own band, The High Speed Scene, which has since released its major-label debut on the Neptunes' imprint, Star-Trak Records.

Neil also left Deathray after the release of their first album, but went on to join numerous bands, including: Milwaukee (as keyboardist with Johnny Gutenberger of Two Sheds, and Chris Robyn of Far), Red Planet, An Angle, Jay Shaner's Cowboy Killers, and he is currently the drummer for the California-country band The Golden Cadillacs.  Following the recording of Cake's album Comfort Eagle, drummer Todd Roper left the band and has since also joined Deathray.

Brown and Gumbiner (continuing his solo electronica project Night Night, and currently owner/producer/engineer at Station To Station Media + Production, and a
contributing writer at TapeOp Magazine) remain the principal songwriters of Deathray, with Damiani also penning several tunes for the band.

A Deathray song titled "I Wanna Lose Control" appears on the soundtrack to the 2006 animated film Open Season, along with a cover of Paul Westerberg's "Wild as I Wanna Be." These are the first two Deathray songs published by a major record label since the band's debut.

As of July 1, 2007 the band has split up, according to an entry on their official website.

Discography

Studio albums

Deathray (2000)
The band's self-titled album was released in 2000 with producer Eric Valentine (Third Eye Blind, Smash Mouth, Citizen King). The genre is usually thought of as pop or post-punk. It has received generous college and radio airplay.

Believe Me (2005)
Deathray self-released their second album in 2005.  Eric Valentine returned as producer.  Again, despite garnering critical acclaim, there was little interest from major labels.

Extended Plays (EPs)

White Sleeves (2002)

Lineup
Dana Gumbiner – vocals, keyboard, guitar
Greg Brown – guitar, vocals
Victor Damiani – bass
Todd Roper – drums, vocals
formerly James Neil 
formerly Max Hart

See also
Cake

References

External links
Deathray's official web site

Rock music groups from California
Musical groups established in 1998
Musical groups disestablished in 2007
Musical groups from Sacramento, California